Core Creek is a tributary of the Neshaminy Creek in Bucks County, Pennsylvania. Rising in Lower Makefield Township, it flows in the Stockton Formation until it meets its confluence with the Neshaminy in Middletown Township. At one time it powered seven mills along its length.

Statistics
The Geographic Names Information System I.D. is 1172452. 

The U.S. Department of the Interior, U.S. Geological Survey I.D. is 02543.

History
An old document in the Library of the Bucks County Historical Society at one time dated "the 3 day of ye 7th month of 1696," the report of a jury appointed by the Court of Bucks County to lay out "a road (viz a cart road) from new towne [Newtown] to ye ferry at Gilbert Wheeler's." At one time there were seven mills along the creek.

Course
Core Creek rises in the northwestern portion of Lower Makefield Township, oriented east, the southeast, then is oriented southwest for some distance, passing into Middletown Township until it passes through Core Creek Park as it passes through Lake Luxembourg, created in 1975. After the lake, it continues southwest until it meets with the Neshaminy Creek.

Geology
Atlantic Plain
Piedmont Province
Gettysburg-Newark Lowland Section
Stockton Formation
Core creek lies within the Stockton Formation, a bedrock of sandstone, arkosic sandstone, shale, siltstone, and mudstone deposited during the Triassic.

Municipalities
Bucks County, Pennsylvania
Middletown Township
Lower Makefield Township

Crossings and Bridges

See also
List of rivers of the United States
List of rivers of Pennsylvania
List of Delaware River tributaries

References

Rivers of Bucks County, Pennsylvania
Rivers of Pennsylvania
Tributaries of the Neshaminy Creek